Jerónimo Albornoz, O.F.M. (1530–1574) was a Roman Catholic prelate who served as Bishop of Córdoba (1570–1574).

Biography
Jerónimo Albornoz was born in Spain in 1530 and ordained a priest in the Order of Friars Minor. On 27 August 1570, he was selected by the King of Spain as Bishop of Córdoba and confirmed by Pope Pius V on 8 November 1570. On 22 July 1571, he was consecrated bishop by Francisco Pacheco de Villena, Cardinal-Deacon of Santa Croce in Gerusalemme, with Balduino de Balduinis, Bishop of Aversa, and Antonio Rodríguez de Pazos y Figueroa, Bishop of Patti, with serving as co-consecrators. He served as Bishop of Córdoba until his death on 27 October 1574.

References

16th-century Roman Catholic bishops in Argentina
Bishops appointed by Pope Pius V
1530 births
1574 deaths
Franciscan bishops
Roman Catholic bishops of Córdoba